Dave Hill is an American comedian, radio host, writer, musician and actor originally from Cleveland, Ohio. He is the host of The Dave Hill Goodtime Hour, a weekly livestream and podcast part of the Maximum Fun network. In 2007 Variety named Hill one of their "10 Comics to Watch". Prior to going into entertainment, Hill worked as an aide at a homeless shelter.

Career

Comedy 
Hill was a frequent panelist on Comedy Central's @midnight program and has appeared on Unbreakable Kimmy Schmidt, The Tick (2016 TV series), Inside Amy Schumer, Full Frontal with Samantha Bee, Comedy Knockout, and The Jim Gaffigan Show, among other shows. He moved to New York City in 2003 and began performing live comedy regularly in 2005. His first TV appearances were as a correspondent on Court tv's Smoking Gun TV. In 2007, Hill starred in the television show The King of Miami on the MOJO HD network. The show also aired on Film24 in the UK and is currently available on Hulu. Hill appeared regularly as a correspondent on the Fuse network's Hoppus on Music hosted by Mark Hoppus of Blink-182 from 2010 to 2012. He also hosts the stage show The Dave Hill Explosion at the Upright Citizens Brigade Theatre in New York and Hollywood and currently appears as on-air talent for HBO and Cinemax. He has also worked extensively for the comedy website Super Deluxe.

In 2004, Hill began posing as a teenager named Lance from Gary, Indiana aiming to get his fictional band Witch Taint signed to a Norwegian black metal record label. His emails with the record label were later archived on a Fansite at www.theblackmetaldialogues.com. In 2017, Hill began doing stage readings of the emails with frequent collaborator Phil Costello, performing the show in New York City, Los Angeles, London, Oslo, and Wacken, Germany among other locations.

In 2007, Hill appeared at HBO's U.S. Comedy Arts Festival in Aspen, Colorado.  Hill has also appeared at the Melbourne International Comedy Festival, the Edinburgh Fringe Festival, the Sasquatch Festival, Bumbershoot, Outside Lands, the Crap Comedy Festival in Oslo, the Bridgetown Comedy Festival in Portland, San Francisco Sketchfest, the New York Comedy Festival, Riot LA, and the Glasgow Comedy Festival among others.  He performs in prisons frequently, including Sing Sing correctional facility in Ossining, New York and Centro de Reinserción Social in Saltillo, Coahuila, Mexico. In addition to performing with fellow comedians, Hill regularly performs comedy with musical acts and opened for Snoop Dogg, Broken Social Scene, Quicksand, Rhett Miller, Down, and Autopsy among others.

In 2014, Hill appeared in a YouTube Show called METAL GRASSHOPPER with Phil H. Anselmo, where Hill plays himself as a metal fan looking to be coached by Phil on how to be metal.

In May 2019, Hill, a Democrat, was permanently banned from Twitter after he repeatedly responded to attacks from Trump supporters with jokes about having consensual sexual intercourse with their mothers and, in some cases, their fathers.

Music 

Hill wrote the theme song for Last Week Tonight with John Oliver, "Go", performed by his band Valley Lodge. The band performed the song live on the show's season 2 finale on November 22, 2015.

In 2016, Hill formed a psychedelic rock band with Chris Reifert called Painted Doll. The band's self-titled debut album was released on Tee Pee Records on February 16, 2018.

Hill was a member of the 1990s alternative band Sons of Elvis, which he formed with friends while a student at Fordham University. The band signed with Priority Records shortly after graduation and released a debut full-length album Glodean in 1995 as well as a limited edition disc titled Mrs. White, featuring live recordings and several tracks from Glodean. The lead single from Glodean, "Formaldehyde", received airplay at radio and on MTV, and was also featured on the soundtrack of the feature film Higher Learning, by director John Singleton. The band also performed two songs live on The Jon Stewart Show in 1995.

Hill also played bass for Cleveland-based rock band Cobra Verde, and currently fronts the power pop band Valley Lodge.  He has also played guitar with Walter Schreifels' solo band, Diamondsnake, a hard rock band also featuring Moby, and bass for Lucy Wainwright Roche and former Faith No More singer Chuck Mosley. Additionally, Hill is the creator and sole member of the semi-fictional Norwegian black metal band Witch Taint.

He has also contributed musical scores to several feature films, including Shoot First and Pray You Live (Because Luck Has Nothing to Do with It) and Dirty Deeds. Additionally, Hill wrote and recorded the theme music for the HBO's Reverb and Janeane Garofalo's 2010 stand-up special If You Will.

Writing 
Hill's Tasteful Nudes: ...and Other Misguided Attempts at Personal Growth and Validation, a collection of anecdotal essays, was published by St. Martin's Press on May 22, 2012.  The book was optioned for television by Comedy Central.  Hill's second essay collection, Dave Hill Doesn't Live Here Anymore, was published by Blue Rider Press, a Penguin Group imprint, on May 10, 2016. On October 8, 2019, Hill's third book, Parking the Moose: One American's Epic Quest to Uncover His Incredible Canadian Roots was published by Doubleday Canada and Penguin Random House. Hill has also written for The New York Times, GQ, Paris Review, XXL, McSweeney's, The Believer, The Cleveland Plain Dealer, Salon, and the Huffington Post among others, and is a frequent contributor to the public radio program This American Life.

In June 2000, Hill wrote what is believed to be the first ever mainstream media article on plushophilia for Salon.

An interview with Hill is included in the Mike Sacks book Poking a Dead Frog: Conversations with Today's Top Comedy Writers published by Viking/Penguin. Hill also contributed an essay to the book Greenwich Village: A Collection of Memories, edited by Judith Stonehill and published by Universe, which also featured contributions from Graydon Carter, Malcolm Gladwell, Calvin Trillin, and Brooke Shields.

Podcast and radio 
In June 2010, Hill launched his own podcast called Dave Hill's Podcasting Incident on iTunes; to promote the show he appeared on the podcast The Complete Guide to Everything.  The podcast, which was rebranded as The Dave Hill Goodtime Hour in 2020, is a part of the Maximum Fun network.

In March 2019, Hill launched a second podcast, Dave Hill: History Fluffer, with TV producer Jim Biederman, comedian Jodi Lennon, and producer Chris Gersbeck. The show places Hill throughout different time periods while Biederman and Lennon question his claims.

In August 2019, Hill launched a third podcast on Maximum Fun called So... You're Canadian with Dave Hill in which he interviews various Canadians in an attempt to better understand the country of Canada, where his grandfather is from.

Hill also hosted The Goddamn Dave Hill Show on free-form radio station WFMU, having taken over the Tuesday The Best Show on WFMU time slot in January 2014. The show went on hiatus from WFMU in 2019, although it has since been revived as an independent livestream and podcast, rebranded as The Dave Hill Goodtime Hour. Hill is also a frequent contributor to the This American Life public radio program.

References

External links 
 
 

Living people
American male comedians
21st-century American comedians
American bass guitarists
American rock guitarists
American male bass guitarists
American radio DJs
People from Cleveland
Guitarists from Ohio
American people of Canadian descent
1974 births